Domenico "Mimmo" Di Carlo (born 23 March 1964) is an Italian football coach and a former player, last in charge of Pordenone.

Career

Player 
Di Carlo started his playing career in his native city, playing for the local Serie C2 team Real Cassino.
After a number of seasons played for Treviso, Ternana, Como (where he never appeared in the first team line-up) and Palermo, where he helped the team to obtain promotion to Serie C1, Di Carlo signed for Serie C1 team Vicenza in 1990. He quickly became one of the key players for the team, with whom he played nine seasons, obtaining two promotions (from Serie C1 to Serie A), one Coppa Italia and reaching the Cup Winners' Cup semi-finals the following year. He left Vicenza in 1999, when he joined Lecce, again in Serie A. His actual last playing season was in 2000-01 for Livorno of Serie C1, even though in November he joined Südtirol of Serie C2 for a very short time.

Coach 
After a period back in Vicenza, where he coached the Primavera youth team, Di Carlo was signed as coach of Serie C2 team Mantova in 2003. He was able to lead the team to back to back promotions up to Serie B for the first in a number of decades. His first Serie B season as coach was even better, as his team surprisingly obtained a place in the promotion play-off finals, being defeated by Torino F.C. after extra time. He coached Mantova in their 2006–07 Serie B campaign, finishing eighth and being the first side to defeat Juventus in its first appearance in the division. In June 2007 he left Mantova.

On 12 June 2007 he was confirmed as the head coach of Serie A team Parma. In his time there, he struggled to keep the crociati out of the relegation zone, only to be ultimately sacked on 10 March 2008 following a 1–2 home loss to Sampdoria.

On 4 November 2008 he was appointed as new Chievo boss following the dismissal of previous coach Giuseppe Iachini. He guided Chievo to two consecutive mid-table placements in the Serie A, which were hailed as impressive results considering the difficulty of competing against more renowned teams with one of the lowest budgets in the league. On 26 May 2010 Di Carlo was confirmed to have resigned from his coaching post at Chievo.

On the same day, he was announced as new head coach of Sampdoria, with whom he made his managerial debut on the European stage in the third qualifying round of the 2010–11 UEFA Champions League and then the 2010–11 UEFA Europa League. Sampdoria's form in Serie A so far had been middling, with the Blucerchiati keeping a tight defense, but struggling to score, especially after the departures of Antonio Cassano and Giampaolo Pazzini. He was sacked on 7 March 2011 after a home loss of 3–2 against Cesena, the last match of a run of ten games that included seven losses and just one win. He was replaced by Alberto Cavasin on the same day.

On 9 June 2011 Di Canio agreed to return to serve as head coach of ChievoVerona for the 2011–12 season. He saved his team from relegation in his first season in charge, but was removed from his duties on 2 October 2012 and replaced by Eugenio Corini following a dismal start to the 2012–13 season.

He then briefly served as head coach of Livorno at the end of the 2013–14 season in a desperate but ultimately unsuccessful attempt from the club to escape relegation.

On 8 December 2014, he was named new head coach of Serie A relegation strugglers Cesena in place of Pierpaolo Bisoli.

On 5 February 2018, he signed with Serie B club Novara. The club was relegated at the end of the season and Di Carlo was replaced.

On 13 November 2018, Di Carlo was appointed manager of Chievo after the resignation of Gian Piero Ventura.

On 1 June 2019, Di Carlo was appointed manager of Vicenza. He guided Vicenza to promotion to Serie B on his first full season in charge, and was successively confirmed for the team's return to the second division. He was sacked on 22 September 2021, following a dismal start in the 2021–22 Serie B season.

On 1 June 2022, Pordenone announced the hiring of Di Carlo as their new head coach, effective from 1 July, on a two-year deal. He was dismissed on 6 March 2022, following a home draw to Pergolettese that left Pordenone in third place in the league table.

Managerial statistics

Honours

Player
Vicenza
Coppa Italia: 1997

Managerial
Mantova
Serie C2 (1): 2003–04
Vicenza
Serie C (1): 2019–20 (Girone B)

References

1964 births
Living people
People from Cassino
Italian footballers
A.S.D. Cassino Calcio 1924 players
Treviso F.B.C. 1993 players
Como 1907 players
Ternana Calcio players
Palermo F.C. players
L.R. Vicenza players
U.S. Lecce players
U.S. Livorno 1915 players
F.C. Südtirol players
Serie A players
Serie B players
Serie C players
Serie D players
Italian football managers
Mantova 1911 managers
Parma Calcio 1913 managers
A.C. ChievoVerona managers
U.C. Sampdoria managers
U.S. Livorno 1915 managers
A.C. Cesena managers
Novara F.C. managers
L.R. Vicenza managers
Pordenone Calcio managers
Serie A managers
Serie B managers
Serie C managers
Association football midfielders
Footballers from Lazio
Spezia Calcio managers
Sportspeople from the Province of Frosinone